Chaetosa punctipes is a species of fly in the family Scathophagidae. It is found in the  Palearctic .

References

Scathophagidae
Insects described in 1826
Taxa named by Johann Wilhelm Meigen